Dehuyeh (also Romanized as Dehūyeh; also known as Deh Mūyeh) is a village in Rostaq Rural District, in the Central District of Neyriz County, Fars Province, Iran. At the 2006 census, its population was 88, in 23 families.

References 

Populated places in Neyriz County